Kalamassery is a major industrial region in the city of Kochi in the state of Kerala, India. It houses companies like Apollo Tyres and HMT; IT/Electronics Parks like KINFRA Hi Tech Park, Startup Village, and Electronics City. Kalamassery is also home to educational institutions such as the National University of Advanced Legal Studies, Ernakulam Medical College, and the Cochin University of Science and Technology. The Thrikkakara temple, Unichira and Eloor industrial township, are in the vicinity of Kalamassery.

The Periyar river flows through Kalamassery. In local administration it is a municipality named Kalamassery Municipality. Government Medical College Ernakulam is situated in Kalamassery. The neighbouring localities of Kalamassery are Thrikkakara, Eloor, Edappally, Choornikkara, Edathala and Aluva.Cochin International Airport is 18 km away from Kalamassery.

Etymology
The name Kalamassery is derived from Kalabhasery. In Malayalam, a word can have multiple meanings: in common usage "kalabham" means yellow sandalwood paste, and in literary Malayalam, it can mean Elephant. Kalabhasery, a location near HMT, was where elephants from Thrikkakara Temple was taken for rest after celebrations at the temple. During the course of time Kalabhasery became Kalamassery. Historically, the prominent area was called Njalakam, place with a prominent Juma Masjid, but during the time of creation of Kalamassery Panchayat which includes Njalakam, it was decided to name the area Kalamassery instead of Njalakam due to the growth of Kalamassery. A primary driver of growth was the nearby Fertilisers and Chemicals Travancore Limited (FACT) in Udyogamandal. Employees of FACT would regularly visit Kalamassery for shopping and other purposes. Many settled down in Kalamassery after retirement in places like Santhinagar and Santhinagar Annexe. This growth was brought about by new industries like HMT in that area. Later, the rapid growth of Kalamassery led to it being promoted to a Municipality.

Demographics
As of 2001 India census, Kalamassery had a population of 63,176. Sex ratio is 956 females per 1000 males. Kalamassery has an average literacy rate of 84%, which is significantly higher than the national average of 59.5%. Male literacy is 87%, and female literacy is 82%. In Kalamassery, 10% of the population is under 6 years of age. Hinduism is the most professed religion at 41%, followed by Islam (34%).

Geography
The soils consists mainly of recent sediments (Alluvium, Teri's, Brown sand etc.). Red colored sticky soil is also found in these areas. The climate is generally tropical, heavy rains from the southwest and northeast monsoon are common from June through September. The average annual rainfall is about 350 cm.

Economy

FACT, India's 1st large scale unit was set up in 1943 for production of fertiliser. In 1947, FACT Udyogamandal started production of ammonium sulphate with an installed capacity of 10,000 MT nitrogen. FACT became a Kerala State Public Sector Enterprise on 15 August 1960 and on 21 November 1962; the Government of India became a major Shareholder. FACT engineering works was established on 13 April 1966. Aluminium oxide is also produced in Kalamassery. Apollo Tyres acquired the Premier Tyres plant in Kalamassery. The Hindustan Machine Tools also known as HMT is also located at the hearts of Kalamassery . Merchem and Carborundum Universal Electro-minerals division has its offices at South Kalamassery. Many Vehicle aftersales - service centres like Toyota, Renault, Nissan, Volkswagen, Fiat India Automobiles etc., are located at Kalamassery. The Kerala State Electricity Board or KSEB sub-division is at Kalamassery . The Kochi Metro Casting Yard and Metro Village is located at HMT Colony in Kalamassery . The Science City, Startup Village, KINFRA are at Kalamassery. The Water from Periyar is supplied to Kochi City by Various pipes placed which are managed by the PWD and the Kerala Water Authority. India's first telecom incubation center located in kalamassery.

There are also many small scale industries in Kalamassery like St Antony Industries, Micro Tools, Ambadan Industries, Vellappally Manufacturing Industry, Pottekattu Rubbers Pvt. Ltd, Logiwiz, Bajaj etc. A part of South Kalamassery is as an Industrial area, with small scale industries such as perfume making industries and plastic recycling industries. Many people are engaged in employment through these industries. There are also Kudumbasree associations, employing many women. The Main Headquarters of Vodafone India is at South Kalamassery. The largest shopping mall in India- LuLu International Shopping Mall started in 2013 is at Edapally toll, which is a part of Kalamasserry Municipality.

Kalamassery is home to 3 Kochi Metro stations:

 The Kalamassery Town metro station is located at the Premier Junction in Kalamassery, in front of the Apollo Tyres factory.
 The CUSAT metro station, which is located close to Cochin University of Science and Technology in South Kalamassery.
 The Pathadipalam metro station, located near MILMA, ERCMPU LTD in Koonamthai.

Places of interest

Museum of Kerala History
Museum of Kerala History is situated near Pathadippalam Metro Station. It has representations of 87 figures who shaped the history and culture of Kerala in the last two thousand years. The museum has a collection of 150 dolls, all hand-made and detailed, representing the cultural and ethnic diversity of India. The dolls represent young men and women from Gujarat to Nagaland and from Kashmir to Kanyakumari. The gallery depicts mainly specimens of Indian contemporary art (painting and sculpture) over a period of the last two hundred years. The gallery also displays a mural painting based on the classical Sanskrit drama Shakuntalam executed in the traditional Kerala. The mural, at 25 feet long and 5 feet wide, is one of the largest in Kerala.

Kochi Science City
The Science Park is a project of the Kerala government and is located near the Government Medical College, Kalamassery. It houses various attractions for children including an amphitheatre and a planetarium.

Education

Government Medical College Ernakulam
National University of Advanced Legal Studies
Cochin University of Science and Technology
Model Engineering College
St. Paul’s College
Xavier Institute of Management and Entrepreneurship
LBS Centre for Science & Technology
Rajagiri College of Social Sciences
Government Polytechnic College
Little Flower Engineering Institute
Government I.T.I Kalamassery
Food Craft Institute

Places of worship
 St. John of God Roman Catholic Church, Angel Mary Nagar, Kalamassery.
 Thrikkakkara Vamana Moorthy Temple
 SNDP Temple, Kangarappady
 Peringazha Sree Durga Bhagavati Temple
 Korakkambilly Sri Durgabhavathi
 St. Pius Xth Church, Kalamassery
 Thrikkakara Temple
 Ponnakudam Bhagavathy Temple
 Puthuserymala Sri Bhadrakali Temple
 Vidakkuzha Sree Krishna Swami Temple
 Kavungalkavu Durga Temple
 Jnanasidhi Ayyappa Temple
 Kudilil Sree Kurumba Bhagavathi Temple
 Puthalath Devi Temple
 St. George Orthodox Church, Seaport Airport Road, Kalamassery
 Njalakam Juma Masjid, South Kalamassery
 Hayathul Islam Masjid, Changampuzha Nagar
 Kalamassery Mahaganapathy Temple
 St. Thomas Marthoma Church Kalamassery
 All Saints CSI Church
 St Marys Jacobite Church
 St Jude Knayana Church
 Kavungal Kaavu Shri Durga Bhagavathi Temple Pallilamkara
Ibrahim Masjid, Mannopilly
Hidayathul Islam Masjid, Changampuzha Nagar
St. Joseph's Church Kalamassery (Social Church)

Residential Projects
 ABAD Builders Silver Dew is an apartment project in Kalamassery
 Asset Homes Pvt Ltd is a leading builder in Kerala. Asset Kasavu is an aristocratic villa in Kalamassery by them. 
 Dreamflower Monparadis is a residential flat in Kalamassery
 SMS VISTA by SMS Builders is a residential apartment near Kalamassery
 SMS TEJUS by SMS Builders is a residential apartment near Kalamassery
Raymount by Nucleus properties is a residential apartment near kalamassery

See also
Koonamthai
Kangarappady
Thrikkakara

References

Neighbourhoods in Kochi